André Bourgey (9 September 1936, Saint-Étienne) is a French geographer, a specialist of the Arab world.

Biography 
André Bourgey attended high school in Lyon and Algiers then graduated from Lyon University.

An agrégé in geography, he became a high school teacher for geography then an assistant in Lyon, before going to a post in Beirut (Centre d'étude et de recherche sur le Moyen-Orient contemporain - "Centre for Study and Research on Contemporary Middle East") where he sojourned from 1968 to 1983.

From 1983 until he retired, he taught the geography of the Middle East and North Africa at the Institut national des langues et civilisations orientales (INALCO or "Langues'O").

He was president of the INALCO from 1993 to 2001, director of the Institute of Arab and Islamic Studies (Paris III University) from 1989 to 1992, a member of the Board of the Arab World Institute (from 1993) and that of the Agence universitaire de la Francophonie from 1998 to 2001.

External links 
 André Bourgey on data.bnf.fr
 Publications on Cairn
 Quelle réalité communautaire chiite au MO ? - André Bourgey
 Migrations et changements sociaux dans l'Orient arabe
 Le barrage de Tabqa et l'aménagement du bassin de l'Euphrate en Syrie Article on Persée

French geographers
University of Lyon alumni
Chevaliers of the Légion d'honneur
Officers of the Ordre national du Mérite
Commandeurs of the Ordre des Palmes Académiques
1936 births
Scientists from Saint-Étienne
Living people